The Scottish FA Women's International Roll of Honour is a list established by the Scottish Football Association recognising women players who have gained 50 or more international caps for Scotland. The roll of honour was launched in 2017 with a 100-cap threshold, when 12 players had already achieved that distinction. Since then, Rachel Corsie (2018) and Hayley Lauder (2019) have also passed the 100-appearance milestone.

Players on the roll of honour

See also
List of Scotland women's international footballers
List of women's footballers with 100 or more caps
Scottish FA International Roll of Honour (men's)

References

Roll of Honour
Association football museums and halls of fame
Halls of fame in Scotland
National football
Roll of honour
2017 establishments in Scotland
Association football player non-biographical articles